Jack Deakin (1873 – after 1899) was an English footballer who played in the Football League for Stoke.

Career
Deakin was born in Stoke-upon-Trent and played with Dresden United before joining Stoke in 1898. He played twice for Stoke in the 1898–99 season both coming towards the end of the season against Notts County and Bury. He left at the end of the season to play for Hanley Swifts.

Career statistics

References

1873 births
Year of death missing
Footballers from Stoke-on-Trent
English footballers
Dresden United F.C. players
Stoke City F.C. players
English Football League players
Association football defenders